The Rockdale Town Hall is a civic building located on the corner of the Princes Highway and Bryant Street in Rockdale, a suburb of Sydney, New South Wales, Australia.

History
Rockdale Town Hall was opened by The Rt Hon. The Lord Wakehurst , Governor of New South Wales, on 12 October 1940. The building was designed by then-local architect Douglas Gardiner, who became a Melbourne-based partner of Bates Smart & McCutcheon after World War II.

It is built of face brick detailed with stone at copings and around window architraves. The building entrance is marked by a stone portico and brick tower. The hall's interiors have elaborate art deco style plaster details to it walls and ceiling. The building is listed on local government heritage register within the New South Wales Heritage Database as "a fine representative example of a late inter-war stripped classical building with functionalist influences".

See also

 List of town halls in Sydney
 Architecture of Sydney

References

Government buildings completed in 1940
Town halls in Sydney
Art Deco architecture in Sydney
1940 establishments in Australia